Železne Dveri ( or) is a settlement in the hills south of Ljutomer in northeastern Slovenia. The area traditionally belonged to the Styria region and is now included in the Mura Statistical Region.

Landmarks
There is a Baroque mansion in the settlement. It was built after 1751 on the site of an earlier building.

References

External links

Železne Dveri on Geopedia

Populated places in the Municipality of Ljutomer